Sir Adye Douglas (31 May 1815 – 10 April 1906) was an Australian lawyer and politician, and first class cricket player, who played one match for Tasmania. He was Premier of Tasmania from 15 August 1884 to 8 March 1886.

Early life

The son of Captain Henry Osborne Douglas, and his wife Eleanor, Douglas was born in Thorpe, Norfolk, England of Scottish descent. His father was an army officer, but his grandfather, Billy Douglas was an admiral and five uncles were post-captains. Douglas was educated in Hampshire and Caen, France, before doing his articles with a Southampton law firm. He migrated to Van Diemen's Land (now Tasmania) aboard the Louisa Campbell in 1839.

Early career

Douglas was admitted to the Supreme Court of Tasmania, but went to Victoria where he ran a sheep farm near Kilmore with his brother. He tired of farming, and in 1842 he returned to Launceston, where he established his own law firm, which still operates today.

Douglas was very interested in the development and welfare of the colony, and was a supporter of both the establishment of local responsible government and the name change from Van Diemens Land to Tasmania. He was also a strong advocate of the Anti-Transportation League.

Cricket

Ayde Douglas played his only first class cricket match at South Yarra Ground, Melbourne, on 29 and 30 March 1852 for Tasmania against Victoria. He scored a duck in the first innings, and 6 in the second. He also took 0/5 off 2 overs in Victoria's second innings.

Later career

Douglas was elected as an alderman of Launceston in 1853, and served until 1884, including two terms as mayor from 1865 to 1866, and 1880–1882.

In 1856 Douglas was one of the first representatives elected to Tasmania's new House of Assembly, but was soon frustrated by lack of support. He resigned in 1857 to travel in North America, France, and England, before soon returning to Tasmania.

Whilst abroad, Douglas had been impressed by the development of railways in those places, and felt strongly that Tasmania needed to develop its own railways. He failed to gain support for the development of a Hobart to Launceston railway, but did push through a Launceston to Deloraine railway, the Launceston and Western Railway.

He was a major shareholder in the Ilfacombe Iron Company, a venture to smelt iron ore in Northern Tasmania in 1873, and after its failure was the buyer of its assets. He was also one of the buyers of the assets and iron ore mining leases of the Tamar Hematite Iron Company, in 1877, part of a highly unethical, though technically legal, ploy to obtain cheaply a pre-emptive right to a valuable gold mining lease. Despite its dubious origins, the lease—adjacent to the bountiful Tasmania Mine—was lucrative for its new owners. The whole scheme had depended upon the operation of a piece of new legislation (Mineral Lands Act of 1877) that had just been voted upon in the Tasmanian Parliament, by four of the five new owners—like Douglas, wealthy Tasmanian politicians. It can now be seen as an early instance of a conflict of interest, amounting to political corruption.

Douglas was a member of the Tasmanian House of Assembly from 1862 until 1884, when he became a member of the Tasmanian Legislative Council instead. He served as Premier of Tasmania from 1884 until 1886.

Douglas represented Tasmania at the Federal Council of Australasia,and was elected as one of the ten Tasmanian delegates to the Federal Convention of Australasia. There he epitomised conservative opinion within the Convention.  More than any other delegate, Douglas voted against what Alfred Deakin voted for; in fact, no other pair of delegates differed more in their votes than these two. For all his evident conservatism, Douglas recommended a Yes vote in the Federation referendums, and favoured the establishment of an Australian Republic.

Douglas resigned as Premier in 1886 to take up a post as Tasmanian Agent-General in London, but was soon recalled due to problems with his railway associations in Tasmania. He returned to the Tasmanian Legislative Council from 1890 to 1904, and was made a knight bachelor on 14 August 1902, being described as "The first amongst the Tasmanians", by then Governor of Tasmania, Captain Sir Arthur Havelock.

Personal life

In 1836 Douglas married Eliza Clarke and she died in 1839. In 1858 Douglas married Martha Matilda Collins (née Rolls) and she died in 1872 in Launceston, Tasmania. In 1873, he married Charlotte Richards, and they had a daughter Eleanor (1873–1936), and Charlotte died in 1876. In 1877, he married Charlotte's sister, Ida, in Adelaide, and they had four sons, and four daughters.

Sir Adye Douglas died on 10 April 1906, in Hobart, Tasmania, aged 90 years and 314 days.

See also
 List of Tasmanian representative cricketers

References 

 
 Cricinfo Profile
 P. T. McKay, F. C. Green, 'Douglas, Sir Adye (1815–1906)', Australian Dictionary of Biography, Volume 4, MUP, 1972, pp 87–88.
 

1815 births
1906 deaths
Australian federationists
Premiers of Tasmania
Tasmania cricketers
Presidents of the Tasmanian Legislative Council
Australian Knights Bachelor
Cricketers from Hobart
Australian people of Scottish descent
English people of Scottish descent
People from Thorpe St Andrew
Mayors of Launceston, Tasmania
Australian republicans
Members of the Tasmanian House of Assembly
19th-century Australian politicians
20th-century Australian politicians
English emigrants to colonial Australia
Sportspeople from Hobart